The Canadian Folk Music Award for Indigenous Songwriter of the Year is a Canadian award, presented as part of the Canadian Folk Music Awards to honour the year's best songwriting by First Nations and Inuit artists. Unlike many songwriting awards, the nomination is given in consideration of all of the songwriting on a whole album rather than singling out individual songs. Awards are also presented for English Songwriter of the Year and French Songwriter of the Year.

The award was formerly presented as Aboriginal Songwriter of the Year, and was renamed from aboriginal to indigenous in 2018.

2000s

2010s

2020s

References

Indigenous Songwriter
Songwriting awards
Indigenous Canadian music awards